The 1916 Wisconsin gubernatorial election was held on November 7, 1916.

Incumbent Republican Governor Emanuel L. Philipp won the election with 52.70% of the vote, winning his second term as governor. Philipp defeated Democratic Party candidate Burt Williams and Socialist candidate Rae Weaver.

Primary elections
Primary elections were held on September 5, 1916.

Democratic primary

Candidates
Burt Williams, Democratic nominee for Lieutenant Governor in 1908

Results

Republican primary

Candidates
Emanuel L. Philipp, incumbent Governor
William H. Hatton, former State Senator and unsuccessful candidate for Democratic nomination for Governor in 1914
Francis E. McGovern, former Governor
Don C. Hall, former member of the Wisconsin State Assembly

Results

Socialist primary

Candidates
Rae Weaver, Socialist nominee for Secretary of State of Wisconsin in 1912

Results

Prohibition primary

Candidates
George McKerrow, Prohibition nominee for Secretary of State of Wisconsin in 1890

Results

General election

Candidates
Major party candidates
Emanuel L. Philipp, Republican
Burt Williams, Democratic

Other candidates
George McKerrow, Prohibition
Rae Weaver, Socialist

Results

References

Bibliography
 
 

1916
Wisconsin
Gubernatorial
November 1916 events